ㅔ(e) is one of the Korean hangul. The Unicode for ㅔ is U+3154.

Stroke order

Hangul jamo
Vowel letters